Arizona wine refers to wine made from grapes grown in the U.S. state of Arizona. There are three major regions of vineyards and wineries in Arizona:
 Verde Valley – north of Phoenix on SR-260 and SR-89A near Sedona
 Sonoita – south of Tucson on SR-83
 Willcox – east of Tucson on the I-10

Most vineyards in Arizona are located in the southeastern portion of the state south and east of Tucson, which is also the location of Arizona's two designated AVA's (American Viticultural Area), the Sonoita AVA (established in 1985)  and the Willcox AVA  (established in 2016). Arizona has enjoyed recent success with wine made from the grape varieties native to Italy and the Rhône valley of southern France.

It is not clear when viticulture and winemaking first began in Arizona.  In 1703, the famous Jesuit missionary and explorer Eusebio Francisco Kino reported growing grapes and making wine for Mass at his mission of Dolores in nearby Sonora.  However historic records suggest there was very little winemaking in Arizona itself during the Spanish period since many of the missions and settlements were not in good winegrowing locations.

During the territorial period, farmers in the Salt River Valley around Phoenix began making wine in the mid-1870s and a small winemaking industry eventually emerged in nearby Mesa during the 1880s.  In northern Arizona, Henry Schuerman established a farm and orchard along Oak Creek in the Verde Valley and later planted a large vineyard to make wine for the nearby mining camp of Jerome. In the fall of 1914, Arizonans voted to go dry and banned the sale and consumption of alcohol, effectively ending Arizona's budding wine industry.    

Starting in the mid-1970s, Dr. Gordon Dutt, a soil scientist at the University of Arizona, conducted experiments that demonstrated that parts of Arizona could produce quality wine grapes.  Dutt went on to found Vina Sonoita Vineyards – the first modern commercial wine vineyard in Arizona.  In 1980, Navy veteran Robert Webb opened the R. W. Webb Winery in Tucson and later established a vineyard south of Willcox.  Other pioneering Arizona winemakers during the 1980s and 1990s included William Staltari, Tino Ocheltree, Al Buhl, and Kent Callaghan.

There now are over 110 wineries, vineyards and cellars throughout Arizona, including in the cities of Phoenix and Tucson.

The wineries, vineyards and cellars are supported by three state and regional organizations: the Arizona Wine Growers Association, a non-profit NGO representing, educating and promoting the state's wine industry, Willcox Wine Country , a non-profit dedicated to increasing viability of wineries and vineyards in the southeast portion of Arizona, and by the Arizona Vignerons Alliance(AZVA), a non-profit organization collecting data on all Arizona wine-growing regions, ensuring authenticity of Arizona wine and working to promote Arizona wine as recognized, respected and sought-after in Arizona, the U.S., and globally.  AWGA supports the wine industry through promotional events, state awards to the best wines in Arizona and industry lobbying efforts at the local, state and national level. AZVA establishes parameters for growing grapes and producing wines in Arizona; verifies, certifies and promotes 100% Arizona wine; collects, evaluates and shares Arizona viniculture data; holds the annual AZVA Symposium and Wine tasting and participates in existing regional and international events to raise national and global awareness of Arizona wine; and promotes truth in labeling by giving the consumer and wine professional accurate information based on a data-driven and fact-based approach to wine labeling.

The Southwest Wine Center, established in 2009, is part of Yavapai College's Verde Valley Campus. SWC provides education and training for the AZ wine industry through Yavapai College's Viticulture and Enology Program.  Students at YC can earn an AA in Viticulture and Enology or a certificate in Viticulture or Enology.

See also
 American wine
 Blood into Wine, a documentary film about the Northern Arizona wine industry
 Caduceus Cellars, an Arizona winery
 Kokopelli Winery, an Arizona winery
 Page Springs Cellars, an Arizona winery
 Superstition Meadery, an Arizona maker of honey-wine

References

External links
 Arizona Wine Growers Association
 Arizona Vignerons Alliance

 
Wine regions of the United States by state